The Viktualienmarkt is a daily food market and a square in the center of Munich, Germany. It has been held daily since 1807, except on Sundays and public holidays. 

The Viktualienmarkt developed from an original farmers' market to a popular market for gourmets. In an area covering 140 stalls and shops offer flowers, exotic fruit, game, poultry, spices, cheese, fish, juices and so on.

History 

When today's Marienplatz (formerly Schrannenplatz) as a store for cereals and other agricultural products had become too small, Viktualienmarkt as its official successor evolved where it is still situated today due to a decree issued by King Maximilian I on 2 May, 1807. The King ordered that those parts of the market between Heiliggeist Church and Frauenstraße should be relocated and told municipal authorities to demolish the buildings of the Heiliggeist hospice which had been acquired by the city. Thus, the "green market" had its own place, which was also named "market place" for some time. It was only later that the word "Viktualien" (victuals), Latin for food, was used. 

From 1823 to 1829 the central market already had to be enlarged significantly. In 1885 the ancient Heiliggeist infirmary was demolished and the Heiliggeist Church was extended to the west. 

In 1852, the precursor of today's Großmarkthalle, the Schrannenhalle, was built close to the ancient city wall at the end of Blumenstraße. It burned down in 1932 and was reopened in 2005. 

In 1855 the fish market was moved to Westenriederstraße. Over the course of time many additions were made to the market, for example a butchers' hall, a tripe hall, pavilions for bakeries, fruit vendors and a fish hall. The butchers' shops at the foot of Petersbergl (Peter's hill, site of Peter's Church), the stalls for poultry and venison and the stands of the flower vendors expanded even further. 

During World War II the square was severely damaged. There was talk of closing down the market in order to erect multi-story buildings. Instead, municipal authorities revitalized Viktualienmarkt with considerable financial support, and the citizens of Munich enriched it with memorial fountains for the folk singers and comedians Karl Valentin, Weiß Ferdl and Liesl Karlstadt. Later, memorial fountains for the folk singers and comedians Ida Schumacher, Elise Aulinger and Roider Jackl were added.

In a 2009 New York Times article about meals worth a plane trip across the Atlantic, food critic Mimi Sheraton picked a snack of sausages at the Viktualienmarkt.

Opening hours 
In earlier times, the Viktualienmarkt was open every day (including Sunday) from 7 A.M. until dusk. Only on religious holidays, the market remained closed. Since the Viktualienmarkt was the central place for the food supply of the citizens of Munich, and there were no refrigeration facilities yet, the daily opening was crucial.

Today, Viktualienmarkt is open until 8:00 P.M. at the latest, Monday through Saturday, as part of the statutory opening hours, with exceptions for florists, bakers and restaurants. Many market stalls do not exhaust the legally permitted opening hours, but each have their own reduced opening hours.

Events 

The market also hosts a number of traditional and folkloric events such as weighing celebrities, brewers' day, gardeners' day, opening of the asparagus season, summer festival, dance of the market women on Shrove Tuesday, etc. Hence, the Viktualienmarkt, which has been a pedestrian zone since November 6, 1975 is also a meeting point.

Administration 

The Viktualienmarkt is organized by the Wholesale Market Munich. The Wholesale Market Munich, together with Viktualienmarkt, Elisabethmarkt, Pasing Viktualienmarkt, Wiener Markt and the Weekly Markets in Munich, are operated by Munich Markets, a municipal company run by the City of Munich.

References

External links 

Panorama View

Squares in Munich
Retail markets in Munich
Tourist attractions in Munich
Culture in Munich